Richard B. Chess (March 7, 1913 – March 2, 1982) was an American politician who was a Democratic member of the Pennsylvania House of Representatives.

References

Democratic Party members of the Pennsylvania House of Representatives
1982 deaths
1913 births
20th-century American politicians